Evolution is a 2001 American comic science fiction film directed by Ivan Reitman. It stars David Duchovny, Orlando Jones, Seann William Scott, Julianne Moore, and Ted Levine. It was released by DreamWorks Pictures in the United States and by Columbia Pictures internationally. The plot of the film follows college professor Ira Kane (Duchovny) and geologist Harry Block (Jones), who investigate a large meteor crash in Arizona. They discover that the meteor harbors extra-terrestrial lifeforms, which are evolving very quickly into large, diverse and outlandish creatures.

Evolution was based on a story by Don Jakoby, who originally wrote it as a serious science fiction horror thriller film, until director Reitman hired David Diamond and David Weissman to re-write much of the script into a comedy which Don liked. Shooting took place from October 19, 2000 to February 7, 2001 in California and Page, Arizona, with an $80 million budget, and the film was released in the United States on June 8, 2001. The film grossed $98.4 million internationally. A short-lived animated series, Alienators: Evolution Continues, loosely based on the film, was broadcast months after the film was released.

Plot
A large meteor crashes in the barren Arizona desert late at night, which aspiring firefighter Wayne Grey witnesses. The next day, science professors Ira Kane and Harry Block from nearby Glen Canyon Community College investigate the crash site, discovering the meteor has landed in a large cave and 'bleeds' a strange blue liquid when scraped. They quickly learn that the meteor harbors extra-terrestrial nitrogen-based microorganisms that condense millions of years of evolution within a matter of hours: the next day, the microscopic organisms have evolved into asexual fungi and flatworms that cannot yet breathe oxygen, and aquatic life the day after that.

After the U.S. Army soon seals off the site, Ira and Harry ask Brigadier General Russell Woodman, Ira's former boss, and the clumsy Dr. Allison Reed, senior researcher in epidemiology at the CDC, to aid in their research, but their efforts fail when two weeks later, Ira goes to court to be allowed to be part of the federal investigation. When Allison questions him as a witness, he reveals that he was discharged from the army in the summer of 1997 after an experiment in May of that year, in which he developed an anthrax vaccine and administered it to nearly 140,000 soldiers. This resulted in terrible consequences, which led to his dismissal from his position as a top-level researcher at USAMRIID. Upon returning to the lab, Ira and Harry discover that Woodman has stolen their research, forcing them to infiltrate the base in disguise to get another meteor sample. They discover that the caverns now harbor an alien rainforest teeming with tropical plant and animal life, including flying insects and carnivorous plant-life. That night, a large reptilian creature fatally mauls the owner of a local country club where Wayne works, and the next day a dog-sized frog-like animal attacks two elderly ladies in their home. Ira, Harry and Wayne find a valley behind the home filled with suffocating dragon-like creatures, which they theorize cannot yet breathe oxygen and are escaping from the meteor site through the local caverns. However, a newly-born dragon quickly adapts to the earth's oxygen and terrorizes a shopping mall before the trio gun it down.

With the media becoming increasingly aware of the alien attacks, Governor Lewis visits the site demanding answers, furious at not being informed earlier about the situation. Allison believes that the aliens will engulf the United States in two months, and Woodman suggests a napalm strike to destroy the meteor's contents and the surrounding town. Though Lewis opposes bombing the community, primate-like creatures suddenly attack the base and wound several members, persuading him to approve Woodman's napalm strike. Disgusted, Allison quits the CDC and joins Ira's crew. Ira later realizes that intense heat triggers the aliens' DNA and that the initial impact to Earth activated its evolution. Woodman ignores Allison's pleas and the town begins evacuating for the impending bombing strike. Looking at the positions of nitrogen and carbon on the periodic table on the back of Allison's T-shirt, Ira theorizes that selenium might be as toxic to the aliens as arsenic is to Earth's carbon life. Rather surprisingly, two of his dumbest students, Deke and Danny Donald, recall that selenium sulfide is the active ingredient in Head & Shoulders hair shampoo, which they decide to use against the alien organisms.

Wayne procures a firetruck and fills it with the shampoo with help from Ira's college students. However, Woodman's napalm strike goes off ahead of schedule before the team can try their plan, triggering the entire alien ecosystem to fuse together into a single immense amoeba-like blob that stands hundreds of feet tall. The giant mass begins multiplying through mitosis, which it would do infinitely until the country was overtaken by thousands of these gigantic creatures. The team maneuvers their firetruck underneath the mass and discovers a rectal-like orifice to spray the shampoo up-into; moments before the creature splits into two, the team succeeds and the monster explodes. The governor declares Ira, Harry, Wayne and Allison heroes; Wayne is made a fully-credentialed firefighter, and Ira and Allison begin dating.

Later, Harry, Ira and Wayne are shown promoting Head & Shoulders for both hair-care and fighting the aliens.

Cast

Production

Development
Evolution was based on a story by Don Jakoby, who originally wrote his draft in 1998 as a serious science fiction horror thriller that was described as "humorless and violent" and "The Thing meets The Andromeda Strain", envisioning John Carpenter to helm his idea. Ivan Reitman loved the script but saw potential in the film being successful as a comedy, calling it a "modern-day successor to Ghostbusters" he had always planned to make. Reitman hired writers David Diamond and David Weissman to re-write much of the script and combine it with elements of another screenplay, a comedy written by Todd Phillips and Scot Armstrong about three friends who hunt aliens. Although Jakoby was initially upset about the script's change in tone and atmosphere, Diamond and Wiessman worked closely with him to ensure the final product was something he was happy with. The original script ended with the alien organisms evolving into an ultra-intelligent humanoid species that climaxed with a "battle of wits", but this ending was deemed not exciting enough and was replaced with the climax seen in the final film.

Reitman produced the film Beethoven in which Duchovny had a small role, and had him in mind as a leading man who could do comedy. Seann William Scott was cast after starring in Road Trip which Reitman also produced. Duchovny wanted to move away from the character he was known for in the X-Files television series, and thought a comedy about aliens would help him transition to different roles.

Filming
Shooting took place from October 19, 2000 to February 7, 2001 in Page, Arizona and around the Greater Los Angeles area, particularly in the Santa Clarita, California region. The scenes taking place at the fictional Glen Canyon Community college were filmed at Cal State Fullerton. The shopping mall scenes took place at the Hawthorne Plaza in Hawthorne, California. The first scene to be shot was the monster attack on two elderly ladies.
Studio shooting took place at Downey Studios and Raleigh Studios.

Visual effects

Tippett Studio was put in charge of designing over 18 various aliens in the film, each different from the last. Sony Pictures Imageworks handled the animation for the alien flatworm CGI sequence with the leech alien from the pool, designed by Peter Konig, the alien mosquito shape moving around within Harry’s body and some additional VFX provided from Pacific Data Images. Studio ADI was responsible for the designs of the primate alien creatures.

Music
The film's music score was composed by John Powell, conducted by Gavin Greenaway, and performed by the Hollywood Symphony Orchestra. A soundtrack album was released on June 12, 2001 and is available on Varèse Sarabande.

Home media
The film was released on VHS and DVD on December 26, 2001.

Reception
On review aggregator Rotten Tomatoes, the film holds an approval rating of 43% based on 139 reviews, with an average score of 4.90/10. The website's critical consensus reads, "Director Reitman tries to remake Ghostbusters, but his efforts are largely unsuccessful because the movie has too many comedic misfires." On Metacritic, the film received a score of 40 based on 32 reviews, indicating "mixed or average reviews". Audiences surveyed by CinemaScore gave the film a grade B+ on scale of A to F.

Todd McCarthy of Variety called it "a consistently amusing action romp".
Roger Ebert of the Chicago Sun-Times the film 2.5 out of 4, and wrote: "It's not good, but it's nowhere near as bad as most recent comedies; it has real laughs, but it misses just as many real opportunities".
A. O. Scott of The New York Times wrote: "The movie itself evolves in reverse, starting life as a moderately clever grab bag of high-concept noodling and half-witty badinage before descending into the primordial ooze of explosions and elaborate lower- intestinal gags".

Television series

Evolution was made into an animated series called Alienators: Evolution Continues, which ran on Fox Kids from 2001 to 2002.

See also
 List of American films of 2001
 Panspermia

References

External links

 
 

2000s English-language films
2000s science fiction comedy films
2000s monster movies
2001 comedy films
2001 films
American science fiction comedy films
American monster movies
Alien invasions in films
Films about evolution
Films set in Arizona
Columbia Pictures films
DreamWorks Pictures films
Films adapted into television shows
Films directed by Ivan Reitman
Films scored by John Powell
Films produced by Ivan Reitman
The Montecito Picture Company films
2000s American films